The 1996 World Junior Championships in Athletics were held in Sydney, Australia on August 20–25.

Results

Men

Women

Medal table

Participation
According to an unofficial count through an unofficial result list, 1049 athletes from 142 countries participated in the event.  This is in agreement with the official numbers as published.

References

External links
Medalists at GBRathletics.com
Results
 Official results

 
1996
World Junior Championships in Athletics
World Junior Championships in Athletics
A
International athletics competitions hosted by Australia
Youth sport in Australia